Jean Stanfield is an American politician who has served in the New Jersey Senate from the 8th Legislative District since 2022. She previously served in the New Jersey General Assembly, representing the 8th Legislative District from 2020 to 2022. Stanfield previously served as Sheriff of Burlington County from 2002 to 2019.

Burlington County Sheriff 
First elected Sheriff in 2001, Stanfield was re-elected five times as Sheriff. On February 22, 2019, she announced she would not run for a seventh term in 2019 and would resign as Sheriff on May 1 of that year.

New Jersey Assembly 
After the 8th District's Senator Dawn Addiego switched her party from Republican to Democrat in early 2019, one of the district's sitting Assemblyman Joe Howarth reportedly attempted to do the same. The Burlington County Republican Party dropped support for Howarth, choosing to instead support former Burlington County Sheriff Stanfield to run with incumbent Ryan Peters. In the primary election Howarth heavily tied himself to President Donald Trump, however Stanfield and Peters beat Howarth.

Stanfield, a resident of Westampton Township, and Peters faced off against Democrats Mark Natale and Gina LaPlaca in the general election. Peters and Stanfield won by a little over 1,100 votes.

Committees 
Education 
Human Services
Law and Public Safety

New Jersey Senate 
In the 2021 general election, Stanfield ran for the New Jersey State Senate against incumbent Democrat Dawn Addiego. Addiego had long served in public office as a Republican, but switched to the Democratic Party in January 2019. With two weeks left before election day, the race for the three seats in the legislature had already attracted $3 million in spending by the candidates and outside groups. Addiego had a 12-1 fundraising margin over Stanfield.  In spite of Addiego's financial advantage, Stanfield won in a close election.

On January 11, 2023, Stanfield announced that she would not be a candidate for reelection.

Electoral history

Assembly

Sheriff

References

Republican Party members of the New Jersey General Assembly
Year of birth missing (living people)
21st-century American politicians
New Jersey sheriffs
People from Westampton Township, New Jersey
Politicians from Burlington County, New Jersey
Living people
Women state legislators in New Jersey
21st-century American women politicians
Republican Party New Jersey state senators